Ulmus uyematsui Hayata, commonly known as the Alishan elm, is endemic to forests at elevations of  in Alishan, Chiayi County , central Taiwan, where it is considered one of the minor tree species. The tree was first named and described by the Japanese botanist Bunzō Hayata in 1913, in the aftermath of the First Sino-Japanese War, when the Republic of Formosa was ceded to Japan.

Description
The tree grows to a height of 25 m with a d.b.h. to 80 cm. The bark is grey, longitudinally fissured, and exfoliates in irregular flakes. The branchlets are brown, glabrous, though pubescent when young, and devoid of corky wings. The largely glabrous leaves are elliptic to oblong-elliptic 5–11 × 3–4.5 cm wide, typically caudate at the apex; the margins are doubly serrate . Unlike most elms, the leaves are equal at the base, have short (2–6 mm) petioles, and are flushed dark-red on emergence. The perfect wind-pollinated apetalous flowers appear on second-year shoots in February, the obovate to orbicular samarae, 10–15 × 8–10 mm, in March.

Hayata considered the tree similar to Ulmus castaneifolia, differing only in the much thinner leaves, and absence of pubescence on the axils of the primary lateral veins.

Pests and diseases
No information available.

Cultivation
U. uyematsui is rare in cultivation beyond Taiwan; it was introduced to commerce in the Netherlands in 2011.

Etymology
The species is named for K. Uyematsu, who collected the plant in 1913.

Accessions

North America
United States National Arboretum, Washington, D.C., US. Two small trees imported 2011. No accession details available.

Europe
Grange Farm Arboretum , Lincolnshire, UK. Acc. no. 839.
Istituto per la Protezione delle Piante, Florence, Italy. 2 small (1 m) plants, (2011).
Royal Botanic Garden Edinburgh, UK. Acc. no. 20112233.
Royal Botanic Gardens, Kew, UK. Acc. no. not known.
Sir Harold Hillier Gardens, Romsey, Hampshire UK. Acc. no. 2011.0267.
Wijdemeren Elm Arboretum, Frans Halslaan, Loosdrecht, Netherlands.

Nurseries
Europe
A Touch of Green , Amstelveen, Netherlands.
Arboretum Waasland , Belgium.
Henny Kolster  via retail nursery Mark & Rein Bulk , Boskoop, Netherlands.
Pan-Global Plants , Frampton-on-Severn, Gloucestershire, UK.
Asia
Tenway Garden Center , Tienwei, Chonghua County, Taiwan.

References

uyematsui
Plants described in 1913
Endemic flora of Taiwan
Trees of Taiwan
Ulmus articles with images
Elm species and varieties